Statistics of Allsvenskan in season 1989.

Overview
The league was contested by 12 teams, with Malmö FF winning the league and IFK Norrköping winning the Swedish championship after the play-offs.

League table

Results

Allsvenskan play-offs 
The 1989 Allsvenskan play-offs was the eight edition of the competition. The four best placed teams from Allsvenskan qualified to the competition. League runners-up IFK Norrköping won the competition and the Swedish championship after defeating Allsvenskan champions Malmö FF. The champion was determined by a final in best of three matches in contrast to previous years.

Semi-finals

First leg

Second leg

Final

IFK Norrköping won 2–1 in matches.

Season statistics

Top scorers

Footnotes

References 

Allsvenskan seasons
Swed
Swed
1